Yosef (Joseph) Dobkin  (13 August 1909 – 9 April 1977) was an Israeli chess master.

Dobkin was born in the Russian Empire. He immigrated to Palestine (British Mandate) in 1924 and studied chemistry at the Hebrew University. He did his Ph.D. thesis, and joined the Department of Physiology. He was an accomplished chess player, received the international master's degree.
 
In April 1935, he tied for 3rd-5th in Tel Aviv (the 2nd Maccabiah Games, Abram Blass won). He played for Palestine/Israeli team in two Chess Olympiads; at third board (+2 –7 =6) in the 6th Olympiad at Warsaw 1935, and at first reserve board (+2 –5 =2) in the 12th Olympiad at Moscow 1956.

In 1974, he took 16th in Israeli Chess Championship (Vladimir Liberzon and Moshe Czerniak won).

References

External links
Yosef Dobkin at 365chess.com
Yosef Dobkin's profile at New in Chess

1909 births
1977 deaths
Russian Jews
Soviet emigrants to Mandatory Palestine
Jewish chess players
Israeli chess players
20th-century Israeli Jews
20th-century chess players